Carcinoembryonic antigen-related cell adhesion molecule 5 (CEACAM5) also known as CD66e (Cluster of Differentiation 66e), is a member of the carcinoembryonic antigen (CEA) gene family.

Functions 
In the literature, CEACAM5 is often used as a synonym for cancer embryonic antigen (CEA), a well-known biomarker of many types of malignancies, colorectal cancer in the first place. Its primary function in the embryonic intestine and colon tumors is adhesion between epithelial cells. Also, it plays a significant role in the inhibition of differentiation  and apoptosis  in colon cells. There are evidences that high CEACAM5 expression is firmly associated with the CD133-positive colorectal cancer stem cells.

See also 
 Cluster of differentiation

References

Further reading

External links 
 
 
 PDBe-KB provides an overview of all the structure information available in the PDB for Human Carcinoembryonic antigen-related cell adhesion molecule 5 (CEACAM5)

Clusters of differentiation